Wiveton Downs is a  biological and geological Site of Special Scientific Interest at Wiveton, west of Sheringham in the English county of Norfolk. It is in the Norfolk Coast Area of Outstanding Natural Beauty.

The site is a classic example of an esker, a glacial crevasse which has been filled in until it forms a narrow winding ridge. It is considered very important for teaching, research and demonstration.

References

Local Nature Reserves in Norfolk 
Sites of Special Scientific Interest in Norfolk
Geological Conservation Review sites